HLTV, formerly an acronym of Half-Life Television, is a news website and forum which covers professional Counter-Strike: Global Offensive esports news, tournaments and statistics. It is one of the leading websites within the Counter-Strike community with over 4 million unique visitors each month. In February 2020, the site was acquired by the sports betting group Better Collective.

History 

HLTV was founded in 2002 by Martin "Martin" Rosenbæk and Per "Nomad" Lambæk. It was initially created to host recordings of Counter-Strike 1.6 matches, although it grew to include Counter-Strike and Half-Life news. HLTV started storing GOTV demos for Counter-Strike: Global Offensive when they were introduced in 2012. It has since evolved to include news, statistics, and analysis for the professional esports scene of Global Offensive.

Since late 2015, HLTV ranks the teams based on their own rating system.  HLTV have awarded Most Valuable Player (MVP) medals to the highest performing player at each tournament. They also award Exceptionally Valuable Player (EVP) medals to players putting in an above average performance. In 2016, HLTV launched dust2.dk, a website dedicated to the Counter-Strike scene in Denmark. They followed this up in 2017 by launching dust2.us, a local website for the Americas. Data, such as professional match results, are fed through from the subsidiary websites to HLTV. Since 2010 with the first version of Counter-Strike, HLTV has ranked all of the professional Counter-Strike players based on their performance that year. In May 2019, HLTV was officially integrated into Global Offensive, where you can now find professional tournaments, provided by data from HLTV.

HLTV has received many visual updates throughout the years, with the most recent one taking place in 2017.

In 2020, HLTV announced that it and sister site dust2.dk had been acquired by Better Collective, a sports betting group based in Denmark.

HLTV rating 
The HLTV rating is the most widely used rating system in Global Offensive, and is often used outside of HLTV.

Rating 1.0 
Rating 1.0 was introduced to HLTV in 2010 with the first version of Counter-Strike.  This rating was based on the number of kills per round, the survival rate of a player per round, and the amount of multikills a player got, which is known as the impact rating. The higher each of these values are, the higher rating a player would get. The HLTV 1.0 rating came under criticism for being too similar to the Kill/Death ratio.

Rating 2.0 
Rating 2.0 was introduced to HLTV on June 6, 2017, as an update to Rating 1.0. Added were two new factors, Kill/Assist/Survival/Traded (KAST) and Average Damage per Round (ADR), along with a changed impact rating. KAST measures the percentage of rounds where a player contributes by killing an enemy, assisting a teammate, surviving a round or getting revenge on an enemy for killing a teammate, known as trading. Impact rating is based on the number of multi-kills, opening kills, 1vX situations (clutches) won and other undisclosed factors. Rating 2.0 is meant to be more accurate than Rating 1.0, since it includes more factors to measure the player's performance. Despite these new adjustments, it is still considered by some to not cover enough. Generally speaking, AWPers and so-called "star riflers" are favored by this rating. The sniper generally has a higher K/D ratio and ADR due to the nature of the weapon, while the star riflers will be put in the most impactful positions on the map. Meanwhile, the players who set up the star players will generally not be favored by this system. This can be through the form of a sacrificial entry fragger who will be traded or a support player throwing utility from the back.

HLTV MVPs
HLTV awards an MVP medal at notable events, which is given to the player they consider had the most impact in the tournament. Starting in 2016, players who win an MVP award are provided a physical medal which are either gold, silver or bronze depending on the significance of the event which it was awarded.

HLTV Top 20 players 
Each year, the HLTV staff rank professional Counter-Strike players based on their performance, and write an article explaining their choice.  These rankings are based on how successful the player's team is, the individual performance based on the HLTV Rating 1.0 and Rating 2.0, and MVP/EVP awards given by HLTV. They have ranked both Counter-Strike and Global Offensive players. 2012 was excluded due to it being a transition year between Counter-Strike and Counter-Strike: Source to Global Offensive.

2010 
1.  Yegor "markeloff" Markelov
2.  Christopher "GeT RiGhT" Alesund
3.  Martin "trace" Heldt
4.  Sergey "starix" Ischuk
5.  Ioann "Edward" Sukhariev
6.  Patrik "f0rest" Lindberg
7.  Filip "NEO" Kubski
8.  Danny "zonic" Sørensen
9.  Andreas "MODDII" Fridh
10. Marucus "delpan" Larsson
11. Jordan "n0thing" Gilbert
12. Rasmus "Gux" Ståhl
13. Christophe "SIXER" Xia
14. Danny "fRoD" Montaner
15. Roman "roman" Ausserdorfer
16. Johan "face" Klasson
17.  Bum-Ki "peri" Jung
18. Richard "Xizt" Landström
19. Danylo "Zeus" Teslenko
20. Harley "dsn" Örwall

2011 
1.  Filip "NEO" Kubski
2.  Christopher "GeT RiGhT" Alesund
3.  
4.  Martin "trace" Heldt
5.  Patrik "f0rest" Lindberg
6.  Wiktor "TaZ" Wojtas
7.  Michael "Friis" Jørgensen
8.  Finn "karrigan" Andersen
9.  
10. Rasmus "Gux" Ståhl
11. 
12. 
13. Richard "Xizt" Landström
14. 
15. Ioann "Edward" Sukhariev
16. Andreas "MODDII" Fridh
17. 
18. 
19. Mihail "Dosia" Stolyarov
20. Sergey "starix" Ischuk

2013 
1.  Christopher "GeT_RiGhT" Alesund
2.  
3.  Richard "shox" Papillon
4.  Mihail "Dosia" Stolyarov
5.  Nathan "NBK-" Schmitt
6.  Richard "Xizt" Landström
7.  Adil "ScreaM" Benrlitom
8.  Jesper "JW" Wecksell
9.  Spencer "Hiko" Martin
10. Ladislav "GuardiaN" Kovács
11. 
12. 
13. 
14. Nicolaj "Nico" Jensen
15. Yegor "markeloff" Markelov
16. Ioann "Edward" Sukhariev
17. Eduoard "SmithZz" Dubourdeaux
18. Peter "dupreeh" Rasmussen
19. 
20. Andreas "Xyp9x" Højsleth

2014 
1.  Christopher "GeT_RiGhT" Alesund
2.  
3.  
4.  Janusz "Snax" Pogorzelski
5.  Jesper "JW" Wecksell
6.  Kenny "kennyS" Schrub
7.  
8.  
9.  Freddy "KRIMZ" Johansson
10. Vincent "Happy" Cervoni
11. Ladislav "GuardiaN" Kovács
12. 
13. 
14. 
15. 
16. 
17. Nathan "NBK-" Schmitt
18. 
19. Fabien "KioShiMa" Fiey
20. Nicolai "dev1ce" Reedtz

2015 
1.  Olof "olofmeister" Kajbjer
2.  Ladislav "GuardiaN" Kovács
3.  Nicolai "dev1ce" Reedtz
4.  Janusz "Snax" Pogorzelski
5.  Robin "flusha" Rönnquist
6.  Kenny "kennyS" Schrub
7.  Freddy "KRIMZ" Johansson
8.  Vincent "Happy" Schopenhauer
9.  Nathan "NBK-" Schmitt
10. Jesper "JW" Wecksell
11. Christopher "GeT_RiGhT" Alesund
12. Peter "dupreeh" Rasmussen
13. Richard "shox" Papillon
14. 
15. 
16. 
17. Filip "NEO" Kubski
18. 
19. 
20. Tyler "Skadoodle" Latham

2016 
1.  
2.  Gabriel "FalleN" Toledo
3.  
4.  Aleksandr "s1mple" Kostyliev
5.  Janusz "Snax" Pogorzelski
6.  
7.  
8.  
9.  Adil "ScreaM" Benrlitom
10. Robin "flusha" Rönnquist
11. Nikola "NiKo" Kovač
12. 
13. Kenny "kennyS" Schrub
14. Emil "Magisk" Reif
15. Fernando "fer" Alvarenga
16. Markus "Kjaerbye" Kjærbye
17. Ladislav "GuardiaN" Kovács
18. Christopher "GeT_RiGhT" Alesund
19. 
20.

2017 
1.  
2.  Nikola "NiKo" Kovač
3.  
4.  
5.  Nicolai "dev1ce" Reedtz
6.  Gabriel "FalleN" Toledo
7.  
8.  Aleksandr "s1mple" Kostyliev
9.  Ladislav "GuardiaN" Kovács
10. 
11. Abay "HObbit" Khasenov
12. Jonathan "EliGE" Jablonowski
13. Andreas "Xyp9x" Højsleth
14. 
15. Markus "Kjaerbye" Kjærbye
16. 
17. Dauren "AdreN" Kystaubayev
18. 
19. 
20. Janusz "Snax" Pogorzelski

2018 
1.  
2.  
3.  Nikola "NiKo" Kovač
4.  
5.  
6.  Keith "NAF" Markovic
7.  Emil "Magisk" Reif
8.  Lukas "gla1ve" Rossander
9.  Freddy "KRIMZ" Johansson
10. 
11. Ladislav "GuardiaN" Kovács
12. Russel "Twistzz" Van Dulken
13. Andreas "Xyp9x" Højsleth
14. 
15. Jonathan "EliGE" Jablonowski
16. 
17. Timothy "" Ta
18. 
19. 
20.

2019 
1.  Mathieu "ZywOo" Herbaut
2.  
3.  
4.  Jonathan "EliGE" Jablonowski
5.  Emil "Magisk" Reif
6.  
7.  Keith "NAF" Markovic
8.  Vincent "Brehze" Cayonte
9.  Russel "Twistzz" Van Dulken
10. 
11. Nikola "NiKo" Kovac
12. 
13. 
14. Andreas "Xyp9x" Højslet
15. 
16. 
17. Freddy "KRIMZ" Johansson
18. Tsvetelin "CeRq" Dimitrov
19. Ludvig "Brollan" Brolin
20. Ethan "Ethan" Arnold

2020 
1.  Mathieu "ZywOo" Herbaut
2.  
3.  
4.  Nikola "NiKo" Kovač
5.  
6.  
7.  
8.  Jonathan "EliGE" Jablonowski
9.  
10. 
11. Emil "⁠Magisk⁠" Reif
12. 
13. 
14. 
15. Ludvig "Brollan" Brolin
16. Henrique "⁠HEN1⁠" Teles
17. Freddy "KRIMZ" Johansson
18. Kaike "⁠KSCERATO⁠" Cerato
19. 
20. Vincent ⁠"Brehze⁠" Cayonte

2021 
1. 
2. Mathieu "ZywOo" Herbaut
3. Nikola "NiKo" Kovač
4. Dmitriy "sh1ro" Sokolov
5. Sergey "Ax1Le" Rykhtorov
6. Abai "HObbit" Hasenov
7. Denis "electroNic" Sharipov
8. Mareks "YEKINDAR" Gaļinskis
9. Valeriy "b1t" Vakhovskiy
10. Dzhami "Jame" Ali
11. Nicolai "dev1ce" Reedtz
12. Nemanja "⁠huNter-⁠" Kovač
13. Benjamin "blameF" Bremer
14. Keith "NAF" Markovic
15. Kaike "KSCERATO" Cerato
16. Martin "stavn" Lund
17. Russel "Twistzz" Van Dulken
18. Robin "ropz" Kool
19. Jonathan "EliGE" Jablonowski
20. Helvijs "broky" Saukants

2022 
1. Aleksandr "s1mple" Kostyliev
2. Mathieu "ZywOo" Herbaut
3. Dmitry "⁠sh1ro⁠" Sokolov
4. Sergey "⁠Ax1Le⁠" Rykhtorov
5. Nikola "⁠NiKo" Kovač
6. Helvijs "broky" Saukants
7. Ilya "m0NESY" Osipov
8. Robin "ropz" Kool
9. Kaike "⁠KSCERATO⁠" Cerato
10. Martin "⁠stavn⁠" Lund
11. Russel "Twistzz" Van Dulken
12. Benjamin "⁠blameF⁠" Bremer
13. Håvard "⁠rain⁠" Nygaard
14. Nemanja "huNter-" Kovač
15. Mareks "⁠YEKINDAR⁠" Gaļinskis
16. Valeriy "b1t" Vakhovskiy
17. David "frozen" Čerňanský 
18. Lotan "Spinx" Giladi
19. Yuri "yuurih" Santos
20. Dzhami "Jame" Ali

References

External links 

Counter-Strike
Video game Internet forums
Video game news websites